Akimbo Alogo is the first full-length solo album from Canadian singer and guitarist Kim Mitchell, released on Alert Records in Canada, and on Bronze Records in other territories, including the United States, United Kingdom, Europe, and Japan. The album includes Mitchell's only significant solo hit in the United States, "Go for Soda", a song which has been featured on TV series such as Canada's Trailer Park Boys, as well as an episode of the American animated sitcom American Dad!. "All We Are", "Feel it Burn" and "Lager & Ale" also received significant airplay in Canada at the time of the album's release and receive airplay on classic rock radio to this day.

The original cover art for this album was changed upon its release after the album was remixed and released in the United States in 1985. For the UK, Japanese, and European releases of this album, the cover art was altered again due to the cigarette pictured in Mitchell's mouth.

Track listing
All songs written by Kim Mitchell and Pye Dubois, unless otherwise indicated.
Side one
"Go for Soda" – 3:28
"That's a Man" – 3:47
"All We Are" – 4:45
"Diary for Rock 'n' Roll Men" – 4:14
"Love Ties" – 4:18

Side two
"Feel It Burn" (Kim Mitchell, Bob Johnson) – 4:14
"Lager & Ale" – 4:05
"Rumour Has It" – 4:09
"Caroline" (Mitchell, Johnson, Dubois) – 3:40
"Called Off" – 4:57

Personnel
Kim Mitchell – lead guitar, lead vocals, arrangements, producer
Peter Fredette – rhythm guitar, keyboards, lead vocals (on choruses of "All We Are"), backing vocals
Robert Sinclair Wilson – bass, keyboards, backing vocals
Paul Delong – drums
Todd Booth – keyboards and lead synthesiser, arrangements
Pye Dubois – lyrics, backing vocals

Production
Nick Blagona – producer, engineer
Joe Finlan, Robin Short – assistant engineers
George Marino – mastering at Sterling Sound, New York
Tom Berry – executive producer

References

Kim Mitchell albums
1984 debut albums
Albums produced by Nick Blagona
Alert Records albums
Bronze Records albums